Lars Johan Lindtner, known as Lasse Lindtner (born March 7, 1955 in Bergen) is a Norwegian actor.

Career
Lindtner is associated with the National Theater and previously worked at the Trøndelag Theater. Before this, he was a well-known actor with the Norwegian Broadcasting Corporation's TV theater department. In radio theater with the Norwegian Broadcasting Corporation he made his mark in the role of the detective Knut Gribb.

He has also played roles in film and television. He had his film debut on 1985, and since then has appeared in various films, including Drømmeslottet (1986), Cross My Heart and Hope to Die (1986), and An Enemy of the People. On television he is known from series such as Vestavind, Familiesagaen De syv søstre, Vazelina Hjulkalender, and Ved kongens bord. Starting in 2002, he played one of the main roles in the situation comedy Holms on TV 2. Starting in fall 2006, he appeared in the new lead role of businessman Magnus Falsen in the soap opera Hotel Cæsar on TV 2.

Lindtner has also served as a Buekorps signal drummer for the Nygaard Battalion. He has also recorded a number of audio book versions for the crime novel series featuring Varg Veum.

Family
Lindtner is the son of the actor Lothar Lindtner and the brother of the politician Per Lothar Lindtner. He is married to Anne Marie Ottersen.

Filmography
Beauty and the Beast (1991): Beast, dubbed voice
An Enemy of the People (2005): Aslaksen
Gurin with the Foxtail (1998): voices: Crow 1 / Crow 2 / Farmer
Weekend (1998) 
Gåten Knut Hamsun (1996): Christian Gierløff
Wives III (1996): Fredrik
Once Upon a Time (1994): dubbed voice
Cross My Heart and Hope to Die (1994): Ane's father
The Buick: Big Boys Don't Cry (1991): Ken
Wayfarers (1990): Skaaro
The Wedding Party (1989): Alf
Hotel St. Pauli (1988): Jor on stage
The Dream Castle (1986): Anders
Farewell Illusions (1985): Helge
Burning Flowers (1985): record salesman

TV
Anno: narrator (seasons 1–2, 2015–16)
Kodenavn Hunter (season 2) (2008)
Hotel Cæsar: Magnus Falsen (2007–08)
Ved kongens bord (2005) (miniseries): Einar Tangen, secretary
Fox Grønland: Johnny Strømberg (two episodes, 2003)
Holms (2002–03): Dr. Jørgen Holm (unknown episodes)
Vazelina hjulkalender (2000) (miniseries): Hans-Fredrik
Familiesagaen de syv søstre (1996): Erling Tofte (unknown episodes, 1998–2000)
Gåten Knut Hamsun (1996) (miniseries): Christian Gierløff
Amalies jul (1995) (miniseries): chimney sweep
Vestavind (1994) (miniseries): Hallvard Nedrebø
Skal det vere ein dans? (1986) (TV theater department): Tobben

References

External links

20th-century Norwegian male actors
21st-century Norwegian male actors
Actors from Bergen
1955 births
Living people
Norwegian male radio actors
Norwegian male television actors
Norwegian male stage actors